is a railway station in the city of  Shinshiro, Aichi Prefecture, Japan, operated by Central Japan Railway Company (JR Tōkai).

Lines
Shinshiro Station is served by the Iida Line, and is located 21.6 kilometers from the starting point of the line at Toyohashi Station.

Station layout
The station has a one side platform and one island platform connected by a footbridge.The station building has automated ticket machines, TOICA automated turnstiles and is staffed.

Platforms

Adjacent stations

|-
!colspan=5|Central Japan Railway Company

Station history
Shinshiro Station was established on April 25, 1898 as a station on the now-defunct . On August 1, 1943, t the Toyokawa Railway were nationalized along with some other local lines to form the Japanese Government Railways (JGR) Iida Line.  Scheduled freight operations were discontinued in 1972. Along with its division and privatization of JNR on April 1, 1987, the station came under the control and operation of the Central Japan Railway Company.

See also
 List of Railway Stations in Japan

References

External links

Railway stations in Japan opened in 1898
Railway stations in Aichi Prefecture
Iida Line
Stations of Central Japan Railway Company
Shinshiro, Aichi